Al-Hawl Subdistrict  is a subdistrict of al-Hasakah District in eastern al-Hasakah Governorate, northeastern Syria. Administrative centre is the town of al-Hawl.

The subdistrict is located east of al-Hasakah. It borders to the Khabur Basin to the west, and the Sinjar mountains just across the Iraqi border to the east.

At the 2004 census, it had a population of 58,916.

Cities, towns and villages

References 

Al-Hasakah District
al-Hawl